Ruger is a surname. Notable people include:
Gaines Ruger Donoho (1857–1916), American painter
Hendrika Ruger (born 1928), Dutch-Canadian author and publisher
Johnny Ruger (born 1949), American biathlete
Theodore Ruger, American jurist and academic administrator 
Thomas H. Ruger (1833–1907), American soldier and lawyer
William Ruger (disambiguation), several people

See also 

 Rüger